The Guatemalan helmeted basilisk (Corytophanes percarinatus) is a species of lizard in the family Corytophanidae. The species is native to Central America and southern Mexico.

Geographic range
C. percarinatus is found in El Salvador, Guatemala, Honduras, and southern Mexico (Chiapas).

Common names
Other common names for C. percarinatus include keeled helmeted basilisk, keeled helmeted iguana, and turipache de hojarasca in Spanish.

Habitat

Reproduction
C. percarinatus is viviparous.

References

Further reading
Duméril AHA (1856). "Description des reptiles nouveaux ou imparfaitement connus de la collection du Muséum d'Histoire Naturelle et remarques sur la classification et les caractères des reptiles ". Archives du Muséum d'Histoire Naturelle, Paris 8: 437-588. (Corytophanes percarinatus, new species, pp. 518–521). (in French).
McCoy CJ (1968). "Reproductive cycles and viviparity in Guatemalan Corythophanes percarinatus (Reptilia: Iguanidae)". Herpetologica 24: 175–178.

Corytophanes
Reptiles of Guatemala
Fauna of Southern Mexico
Reptiles of Mexico
Reptiles described in 1856
Taxa named by Auguste Duméril